Now Winter 2005 is a compilation CD released by EMI Music Australia in 2005. It is the ninth CD of the Australian Now! series. The series took on a new appearance as well as an altered name with the release of Now Winter 2005. Previous releases were named based on what number release it was in the series. The design would be changed again in late 2006.

Track listing
 Rob Thomas – "Lonely No More" (3:47)
 Gorillaz featuring De La Soul – "Feel Good Inc." (3:42)
 Missy Higgins – "The Special Two" (4:25)
 Coldplay – "Speed of Sound" (4:48)
 Kylie Minogue – "Giving You Up" (3:29)
 Tina Cousins – "Wonderful Life" (3:51)
 Moustache featuring Melinda Jackson – "Everywhere" (3:21)
 Max Graham vs. Yes – "Owner of a Lonely Heart" (2:40)
 Live Element – "Something About You" (3:17)
 P-Money and Scribe – "Stop the Music" (3:14)
 Fast Crew – "I Got" (3:53)
 Simple Plan – "Shut Up!" (3:01)
 The Cat Empire – "Sly" (3:45)
 Tamara – "Ooh Ahh" (3:41)
 Ben Lee – "Catch My Disease" (4:14)
 Stereophonics – "Dakota" (4:57)
 Thirsty Merc – "In the Summertime" (3:46)
 The Used – "All That I've Got" (3:25)
 Kyle – "Turn It Up" (3:26)
 Midnight Star – "Midas Touch" (Starskee Radio Edit) (3:28)
 Juliet – "Avalon" (3:57)

External links
 Now Winter 2005 @ AllMusic

2005 compilation albums
EMI Records compilation albums
Now That's What I Call Music! albums (Australian series)